John Byrom may refer to:

 John Byrom (1692–1763), English poet, inventor of a shorthand system
 John Byrom (footballer) (b. 1944), English footballer
 John Byrom (cricketer) (1851–1931), English cricketer
 John Byrom (swimmer) (born 1947), Australian swimmer